Kim Min-gyu (born May 7, 1999) is South Korean professional baseball pitcher who is currently playing for the Doosan Bears of KBO League. He graduated from Whimoon High School (Hangul: 휘문고등학교, Hanja:  徽文高等學校) and was selected to Doosan Bears by a draft in 2018 (2nd draft, 3rd round).

References

External links 

 Career statistics and player information from Korea Baseball Organization
 Kim Min-gyu at Doosan Bears Baseball Club

Living people
KBO League players
KBO League pitchers
Doosan Bears players
1999 births
Baseball players from Seoul
Whimoon High School alumni